Coleophora uralensis is a moth of the family Coleophoridae. It is found in southern France, Spain, Hungary, Croatia, southern Russia, Afghanistan and Iran.

Adults are on wing in late May and June.

References

uralensis
Moths of Europe
Moths of Asia
Moths described in 1961